The Aichi D3A Type 99 Carrier Bomber (Allied reporting name "Val") is a World War II carrier-borne dive bomber. It was the primary dive bomber of the Imperial Japanese Navy (IJN) and was involved in almost all IJN actions, including the attack on Pearl Harbor.

The Aichi D3A was the first Japanese aircraft to bomb American targets in the war, commencing with Pearl Harbor and U.S. bases in the Philippines, such as Clark Air Force Base. They sank more Allied warships than any other Axis aircraft.

Design and development
In mid-1936, the Japanese Navy issued the 11-Shi specification for a monoplane carrier-based dive bomber to replace the existing D1A biplane then in service. Aichi, Nakajima, and Mitsubishi all submitted designs, with the former two subsequently being asked for two prototypes each.

The Aichi design started with low-mounted elliptical wings inspired by the Heinkel He 70 Blitz. It flew slowly enough that the drag from the landing gear was not a serious issue, so the fixed gear was used for simplicity. The aircraft was to be powered by the  Nakajima Hikari 1 nine-cylinder radial engine.

The first prototype was completed in December 1937, and flight trials began a month later, after which it was designated as D3A1. Initial tests were disappointing. The aircraft was underpowered and suffered from directional instability in wide turns, and in tighter turns it tended to snap roll.

The second aircraft was extensively modified before delivery to try to address the problems. Power was increased by replacing the Hikari with the  Mitsubishi Kinsei 3 in a redesigned cowling, and the vertical tail was enlarged to help with the directional instability. The wings were slightly larger in span and the outer sections of the leading edges had wash-out to combat the snap rolls, and strengthened dive brakes were fitted. These changes cured all of the problems except the directional instability, and it was enough for the D3A1 to win over the Nakajima D3N1.

In December 1939, the Navy ordered the aircraft as the Navy Type 99 Carrier Bomber Model 11 (kanjō bakugekiki, usually abbreviated to 艦爆 .). The production models featured slightly smaller wings and increased power in the form of the  Kinsei 43 or  Kinsei 44. The directional instability problem was finally cured with the fitting of a long dorsal fin-strake which started midway down the rear fuselage, and the aircraft actually became highly maneuverable.

In June 1942, an improved version of D3A1, powered by a  Kinsei 54, was tested and designated as D3A2 or the Model 12. Known to the Navy as the Model 22, it began to replace the Model 11 in front-line units in the autumn of 1942, and most Model 11s were then sent to training units. While some late production models of D3A1 were fitted with a propeller spinner, it became a standard with D3A2.

Equipment
The pilot position was equipped with a Type 95 telescopic gunsight in the earlier models and a Type 99 in the later models, which were used for aiming the bomb during the dive. The observer/navigator position was equipped with a Type 97 Mk1 drift sight, which was a long vertical tube located in the front-left of the observer's seat. In addition, the observer position was equipped with a drift meter that was mounted on the floor in the front-right of the observer's seat. The observer also operated a Type 96 Mk2 radio set that was mounted in front of the observer's seat and behind the pilot's seat. On top of the radio set was a Type 3 reflector compass for precise navigation.

Armament was two fixed forward-firing  Type 97 machine guns, and one flexible 7.7 mm (.303 in) Type 92 machine gun at the rear end of cockpit, which was operated by the observer. Normal bomb load was a single 250 kg bomb (e.g., Type 99 No 25 semi-AP or Type 98 No 25 land bomb) carried under the fuselage, swung out under the propeller on release by a trapeze. Two additional 60 kg bombs (e.g., Type 99 No 6 semi-AP or Type 2 No 6 land bomb) could be carried on wing racks located under each wing outboard of the dive brakes.

Initially, D3A dive bombers were painted in silver. During the summer of 1941, the paint finish changed to light olive grey. The color changed again in early 1942 to dark green.

Operational history
An individual D3A dive bomber was commanded by the senior ranking crew member aboard, which could be the observer rather than the pilot. This was in contrast to US Navy, where the pilot was almost always the commander of a dive bomber. For example, Petty Officer First Class Kiyoto Furuta was serving as a pilot to Lieutenant Takehiko Chihaya during the Attack on Pearl Harbor, and later on to Lieutenant Keiichi Arima during the two carrier battles of the Solomon Islands campaign, both of whom were observers.

The D3A1 first saw combat operation in November 1939, one month prior to its official acceptance as the Navy Type 99 dive bomber. Nakajima sent several examples to the 14th Air group operating at Haikou on Hainan island in South China. These D3A1s were commanded by Lieutenant Sadamu Takahashi and supported the Imperial Japanese Army in the capture of Nanning, which was intended to cut the supplies coming from French Indochina. After the capture of Nanning, they continued to be operated in the area in 1940. In May 1940, 12th Air Group became the second front-line unit to be equipped with the new D3A1 dive bombers. They first participated in the capture of Yichang and conducted anti-shipping operations on Yangtze river, west of Yichang, in order to cut the Chinese supplies coming from Chongqing. In September, D3A1 from the 12th Air Group started to fly missions against Chongqing, which was the Chinese capital at the time. After the invasion of Indochina in autumn 1940, 14th Air Group operated at Hanoi and flew missions against Kunming and Burma Road.

The D3A1 commenced carrier qualification trials aboard the aircraft carriers  and  during 1940, while a small number of aircraft made their combat debut from land bases over China. Starting with the attack on Pearl Harbor, the D3A1 took part in all major Japanese carrier operations in the first 10 months of the war. They achieved their first major success against the Royal Navy during their Indian Ocean raid in April 1942. D3A1 dive bombers scored over 80% hits with their bombs during attacks on two heavy cruisers and an aircraft carrier during the operation.

Before the Indian Ocean raid, the established doctrine regarding attacks against ships was to arm all D3A1 dive bombers with semi-AP bombs. On 5 April 1942, an IJN carrier force attacked Colombo on Ceylon with half of its complement, while the other half was kept in reserve for strikes against ships. Since a second strike against Colombo was deemed necessary, the dive bombers of the reserve force were rearmed from semi-AP bombs to land bombs. When British heavy cruisers were spotted soon afterwards, the reserve force was sent with a portion of D3A1 dive bombers armed with land bombs. In the subsequent attack, land bombs unintentionally proved very effective in suppressing the anti-aircraft fire from the ships. As a result, the doctrine was modified in order to intentionally equip the first few D3A1 dive bombers with land bombs. This new method was already implemented for the attack that sank  just four days later, and continued to be used from then on.

During 1942, dive bombing attacks by carrier-based D3A1 and D3A2 bombers significantly contributed to sinking of three US fleet carriers: Lexington at the Battle of the Coral Sea, Yorktown at the Battle of Midway and Hornet at the Battle of the Santa Cruz Islands. In addition, they damaged the carrier Enterprise both at the Battle of the Eastern Solomons and at the Battle of the Santa Cruz Islands. Besides carrier-based units, D3A dive bombers also operated from land bases during the Solomon Islands campaign, where they participated in the Guadalcanal Campaign, Operation I-Go, Operation SE and Operation RO, and during the New Guinea campaign, where they participated in the Battle of Milne Bay and Battle of Buna–Gona. The main land-based unit to operate D3A dive bombers during these campaigns and battles was the 2nd/582nd Air Group.

During the course of the war, D3A dive bombers often combined their attacks upon enemy warships with the IJN Nakajima B5N Kate torpedo bomber; consequently enemy vessels were often sunk by a combination strike of bombs and torpedoes. However, there were occasions when just the D3A's would make the attacks, or at least score the sinking hits. Discounting the Pearl Harbor strike, which also used the B5N for level bombing and torpedo attacks, D3A dive bombers were credited with sinking the following Allied warships (partial list):
 , American destroyer, 19 February 1942 – Australia (Darwin)
 , American destroyer, 1 March 1942 – Java Sea
 , American destroyer, 1 March 1942- Indian Ocean
 , American oiler, 1 March 1942- Indian Ocean
 , British heavy cruiser, 5 April 1942 – Indian Ocean
 , British heavy cruiser, 5 April 1942 – Indian Ocean
 , British armed  merchant cruiser, 5 April 1942 – Indian Ocean
 , British destroyer, 5 April 1942 – Indian Ocean
 , British aircraft carrier, 9 April 1942 – Indian Ocean
 RFA Athelstone, British freighter, 9 April 1942 - Indian Ocean
 HMS Hollyhock, British corvette, 9 April 1942 - Indian Ocean
 SS British Sergeant, British Tanker, 9 April 1942 - Indian Ocean
 SS Norviken, Norwegian Cargo Ship, 9 April 1942 - Indian Ocean
 , Australian destroyer, 9 April 1942 – Indian Ocean
 , American destroyer, 7 May 1942 – Pacific Ocean
 , American destroyer, 1 February 1943 – Pacific Ocean (Ironbottom Sound)
 , American destroyer, 7 April 1943 – Pacific Ocean (Ironbottom Sound)
 , American oiler, 8 April 1943 – Pacific Ocean (Tulagi, Solomon Islands)
 , American destroyer, 26 December 1943 – Pacific Ocean
 , American destroyer, sunk by kamikaze 1 November 1944 – Pacific Ocean
 , American destroyer, sunk by kamikaze 10 June 1945 – Japan (Okinawa)

As the war progressed, there were instances when the dive bombers were pressed into duty as fighters in the interceptor role, their maneuverability being enough to allow them to survive in this role. When the Yokosuka D4Y Suisei became available, the D3A2s ended up with land-based units or operating from the smaller carriers, which were too small to handle the fast-landing Suisei. When American forces recaptured the Philippines in 1944, land-based D3A2s took part in the fighting, but were hopelessly outdated and losses were heavy. By then, many D3A1s and D3A2s were operated by training units in Japan, and several were modified with dual controls as Navy Type 99 Bomber Trainer Model 12s (D3A2-K). During the last year of the war, the D3A2s were pressed back into combat for kamikaze missions.

Operators

 Imperial Japanese Navy Air Service

Surviving aircraft
A D3A2 is currently under restoration at the Planes of Fame Museum in Chino, California.
There are two unrestored D3As on display at the National Museum of the Pacific War in Fredericksburg, Texas. In 2022, the Pearl Harbor Aviation Museum began acquiring the remains of a D3A from Papua New Guinea for eventual exhibit.

Specifications (D3A2 Model 22)

See also

Notes

References

Citations

Bibliography

External links

 Aichi D3A, Joao Paulo Julião Matsuura
 AirToAirCombat.Com: Aichi D3A Val

D3A
D3A, Aichi
Single-engined tractor aircraft
Low-wing aircraft
Carrier-based aircraft
D3A, Aichi
Attack on Pearl Harbor
Aircraft first flown in 1938